Joan G. Walters (August 5, 1924, Providence, Rhode Island – July 31, 2011) was a pioneer in the field of economics. Walters received her master's degree and doctorate from Harvard University. She became the first female professor at Fairfield University in 1963. She died July 31, 2011, at the age of 86.

Works

References

External links
 
 

1924 births
2011 deaths
20th-century American economists
American women economists
Fairfield University faculty
Harvard University alumni
20th-century American women
21st-century American women